The Royal William rose, registered under the cultivar name "KORzaun", is a red hybrid tea rose.

According to The Ultimate Rose Book, the rose was introduced in 1982, the year of the birth of Prince William, then second in the line of succession to the British throne. It has been planted in Savill Garden in Windsor Great Park in celebration of the wedding of Prince William and Catherine Middleton.

The dark red flowers develop from even darker, pointed buds. Due to their long, solid stems, the roses are well suited as cut flowers.

Awards
 was granted several awards, including the Fragrance Award in Monza (1985) and The Hague (1987). The Royal Horticultural Society awarded the cultivar the title Best of the Best in 1987 – jointly with 'Sweet Magic' – and the Award of Garden Merit in 1993.

References

External links 

Entry in HelpMeFind Roses
Savill Garden

Royal William
William, Prince of Wales